The Karuna church is a stone church located in Karuna Sauvo, Southwest Finland, Finland. It was designed by Finnish church architect Josef Stenbäck and built in 1908–1910.  The style of the building reflects National Romantic style with Jugendstil features.

The bell tower is located in the southeast corner of the structure the bells of which were made in 1689. The church has the capacity to seat 480 people.  The altar paintings were created by Ilmari Launis.

The older wooden church has been transported into the open-air museum of Seurasaari, Helsinki.

See also
 Karuna

References

External links 

Lutheran churches in Finland
Sauvo
Josef Stenbäck buildings
20th-century Lutheran churches
National Romantic architecture in Finland
Buildings and structures in Southwest Finland
Churches completed in 1910
Art Nouveau church buildings in Finland
20th-century churches in Finland